In re Walt Disney Derivative Litigation, 907 A 2d 693 (2005) is a U.S. corporate law case concerning the scope of the duty of care under Delaware law. Disney is the leading case on executive compensation.

Facts
The Walt Disney Company appointed Michael Ovitz as executive president and director. He had founded Creative Artists Agency, a premier Hollywood talent finder. He had an income of $20m. Michael Eisner, the chairman, wanted him to join Disney in 1995, and negotiated with him on compensation, led by Disney compensation committee chair Irwin Russell. The other members of the committee and the board were not told until the negotiations were well underway.

Ovitz insisted his pay would go up if things went well, and an exit package if things did not. It totalled about $24 million a year. Irwin Russell cautioned that the pay was significantly above normal levels and 'will raise very strong criticism. Graef Crystal, a compensation expert warned that Ovitz was getting "low risk and high return" but the report was not approved by the whole board or the committee.

On 14 August 1995 Eisner released to the press the appointment, before the compensation committee had formally met to discuss it. Russell, Raymond Watson, Sidney Poitier and Ignacio E. Lozano, Jr. met on 26 September for an hour. They discussed four other major items and the consultant, Crystal, was not invited. Within a year Ovitz lost Eisner's confidence and terminated his contract (though it was certainly not gross negligence). Ovitz walked away with $140m for a year's work. Shareholders brought a derivative suit.

Two decisions were at issue: 1) the hiring of Ovitz, and 2) the firing of Ovitz.

Judgment
Justice Jacobs of the Delaware Supreme Court wrote the opinion. The opinion can be simplified into six main holdings: 1) Ovitz did not breach his fiduciary duties when he negotiated his employment agreement with Disney; 2) Ovitz did not breach his fiduciary duties by accepting the $130 million severance payout defined in his employment agreement, when he was terminated; 3) there was sufficient evidence to show the corporation's compensation committee did not violate its fiduciary duties when it approved Ovitz's employment agreement; 4) neither the board of directors nor the compensation committee was required to vote on Ovitz's termination when the CEO and corporate general counsel had already decided to terminate Ovitz; 5) there was sufficient evidence to show the CEO and corporate general counsel did not breach their fiduciary duties when they concluded Ovitz could not be fired for cause, and was thus entitled to his severance package; and 6) the payment of severance package did not constitute legal waste.

Most of the opinion centers around a discussion of the definition of "bad faith."

Chancellor Chandler noted that the case could only rest on gross negligence, which means 'reckless indifference to or a deliberate disregard of the whole body of stockholders' or actions which are 'without the bounds of reason'. He noted for this reason 'duty of care violations are rarely found'. Then he remarked how good corporate standards are aspirations that change, but fiduciary duties are law that do not. He said Eisner's decision to hire Ovtiz was a business judgment. To counter that, gross negligence or bad faith must be shown. He said he rightly informed himself of all the facts, so was not grossly negligent (even if the behavior should not serve as a model, 'especially at having enthroned himself as the omnipotent and infallible monarch of his personal Magic Kingdom'). It was in good faith, with a subjective belief that he was right and in the company's best interests. The other compensation committee members were considered but let off.

Poitier and Lozano were entirely uninvolved, but it was concluded that neither were grossly negligent or acted in bad faith. He said that in Smith v. Van Gorkom the sale for $735m of TransUnion was much more significant to the company than Ovitz's hiring here. And TransUnion had absolutely no documentation before it when it considered the merger agreement. The compensation committee here was provided with a term sheet for all the key points of the employment contract. TransUnion's senior management completely opposed the merger, but here everyone saw hiring Ovitz as a 'boon for the Company'. So Poitier and Lozano did not 'intentionally disregard a duty to act, nor did they bury their heads in the sand knowing a decision had to be made. They acted in a manner that they believed was in the best interests of the company.

See also

United States corporate law
Re Barings plc (No 5) [1999] 1 BCLC 433
Say on pay

Notes

References
William A. Klein, Business Associations (8th ed Foundation Press 2012) 368
F. Stephen Grace, Jr., & John E. Haupert, Governance Lessons from the Disney Litigation, Business Law Today, September 2011.

External links
Full text of the Supreme Court of Delaware judgment

United States corporate case law
Delaware state case law
2005 in United States case law
2005 in Delaware
Disney litigation